Counterfactual thinking is a concept in psychology that involves the human tendency to create possible alternatives to life events that have already occurred; something that is contrary to what actually happened. Counterfactual thinking is, as it states: "counter to the facts". These thoughts consist of the "What if?" and the "If only..." that occur when thinking of how things could have turned out differently. Counterfactual thoughts include things that – in the present – now could never happen in reality because they solely pertain to events that have occurred in the past.

Overview

The term "Counterfactual"  is defined by the Merriam-Webster Dictionary as contrary to the facts. A counterfactual thought occurs when a person modifies a factual prior event and then assesses the consequences of that change. A person may imagine how an outcome could have turned out differently, if the antecedents that led to that event were different. For example, a person may reflect upon how a car accident could have turned out by imagining how some of the factors could have been different, for example, If only I hadn't been speeding.... These alternatives can be better or worse than the actual situation, and in turn give improved or more disastrous possible outcomes, If only I hadn't been speeding, my car wouldn't have been wrecked or If I hadn't been wearing a seatbelt, I would have been killed.

Counterfactual thoughts have been shown to produce negative emotions, however they may also produce functional or beneficial effects. There are two types of counterfactual thoughts, downward and upward. Downward counterfactuals are thoughts about how the situation could have been worse; and people tend to have a more positive view of the actual outcome. Upward counterfactuals are thoughts about how the situation could have been better. These kinds of thoughts tend to make people feel dissatisfied and unhappy; however, upward counterfactuals are the kind of thoughts that allow people to think about how they can do better in the future.  These counterfactual thoughts, or thoughts of what could have happened, can affect people's emotions, such as causing them to experience regret, guilt, relief, or satisfaction. They can also affect how they view social situations, such as who deserves blame and responsibility.

History

The origin of counterfactual thinking has philosophical roots and can be traced back to early philosophers such as Aristotle and Plato who pondered the epistemological status of subjunctive suppositions and their nonexistent but feasible outcomes. In the seventeenth century, the German philosopher, Leibniz, argued that there could be an infinite number of alternate worlds, so long as they were not in conflict with laws of logic. The well known philosopher Nicholas Rescher (as well as others) has written about the interrelationship between counterfactual reasoning and modal logic. The relationship between counterfactual reasoning based upon modal logic may also be exploited in literature or Victorian Studies, painting and poetry. Ruth M.J. Byrne in The Rational Imagination: How People Create Alternatives to Reality (2005) proposed that the mental representations and cognitive processes that underlie the imagination of alternatives to reality are similar to those that underlie rational thought, including reasoning from counterfactual conditionals.

More recently, counterfactual thinking has gained interest from a psychological perspective. Cognitive scientists have examined the mental representations and cognitive processes that underlie the creation of counterfactuals. Daniel Kahneman and Amos Tversky (1982) pioneered the study of counterfactual thought, showing that people tend to think 'if only' more often about exceptional events than about normal events. Many related tendencies have since been examined, e.g., whether the event is an action or inaction, whether it is controllable, its place in the temporal order of events, or its causal relation to other events. Social psychologists have studied cognitive functioning and counterfactuals in a larger, social context.

Early research on counterfactual thinking took the perspective that these kinds of thoughts were indicative of poor coping skills, psychological error or bias, and were generally dysfunctional in nature. As research developed, a new wave of insight beginning in the 1990s began taking a functional perspective, believing that counterfactual thinking served as a largely beneficial behavioral regulator. Although negative affect and biases arise, the overall benefit is positive for human behavior.

Activation

There are two portions to counterfactual thinking. First, there is the activation portion. This activation is whether we allow the counterfactual thought to seep into our conscious thought. The second portion involves content. This content portion creates the end scenario for the antecedent.

The activation portion leads into the mystery of why we allow ourselves to think of other alternatives that could have been beneficial or harmful to us. It is believed that humans tend to think of counterfactual ideas when there were exceptional circumstances that led to an event, and thus could have been avoided in the first place. We also tend to create counterfactual ideas when we feel guilty about a situation and wish to exert more control. For example, in a study by Davis et al., parents who suffered the death of an infant were more likely to counterfactual think 15 months later if they felt guilty about the incident or if there were odd circumstances surrounding the mortality. In the case of a death of natural causes, parents tended to counterfactual think to a lesser extent over the course of time.

Another factor that determines how much we use counterfactual thought is how close we were to an alternative outcome. This is especially true when there is a negative outcome that was this close to a positive outcome. For example, in a study by Meyers-Levy and Maheswaran, subjects were more likely to counterfactual think alternative circumstances for a target if his house burned down three days after he forgot to renew his insurance versus six months after he forgot to renew his insurance. Therefore, the idea that an outcome almost occurred plays a role in the reason we emphasize that outcome.

Functional basis

One may wonder why we continue to think in counterfactual ways if these thoughts tend to make us feel guilty or negatively about an outcome. One of the functional reasons for this is to correct for mistakes and to avoid making them again in the future. If a person is able to consider another outcome based on a different path, they may take that path in the future and avoid the undesired outcome. It is obvious that the past cannot be changed, however, it is likely that similar situations may occur in the future, and thus we take our counterfactual thoughts as a learning experience. For example, if a person has a terrible job interview and thinks about how it may have been more successful if they had responded in a more confident manner, they are more likely to respond more confidently in their next interview.

Risk aversion

Another reason we continue to use counterfactual theory is to avoid situations that may be unpleasant to us, which is part of our approach and avoidance behavior. Often, people make a conscious effort to avoid situations that may make them feel unpleasant. However, despite our best efforts, we sometimes find ourselves in these unpleasant situations anyway. In these situations, we continue to use counterfactual thinking to think of ways that that event could have been avoided and in turn to learn to avoid those situations again in the future. For example, if a person finds hospitals to be an uncomfortable place, but find themselves in one; due to cutting their finger while doing dishes, they may think of ways they could have avoided going to the hospital by tending to the wound themselves or doing the dishes more carefully.

Behavior intention

We continue to use counterfactual thoughts to change our future behavior in a way that is more positive, or behavior intention. This can involve  making a change in our behavior immediately after the negative event occurred. By actively making a behavioral change, we are completely avoiding the problem again in the future. An example, is forgetting about Mother's Day, and immediately writing the date on the calendar for the following year, as to definitely avoid the problem.

Goal-directed activity

In the same sense as behavior intention, people tend to use counterfactual thinking in goal-directed activity. Past studies have shown that counterfactuals serve a preparative function on both individual and group level. When people fail to achieve their goals, counterfactual thinking will be activated (e.g., studying more after a disappointing grade;). When they engage in upward counterfactual thinking, people are able to imagine alternatives with better positive outcomes. The outcome seems worse when compared to positive alternative outcomes. This realization motivates them to take positive action in order to meet their goal in the future.

Markman, Gavanski, Sherman, and McMullen (1993) identified the repeatability of an event as an important factor in determining what function will be used. For events that happen repeatedly (e.g., sport games) there is an increased motivation to imagine alternative antecedents in order to prepare for a better future outcome. For one-time events, however, the opportunity to improve future performance does not exist, so it is more likely that the person will try to alleviate disappointment by imagining how things could have been worse. The direction of the counterfactual statement is also indicative of which function may be used. Upward counterfactuals have a greater preparative function and focus on future improvement, while downward counterfactuals are used as a coping mechanism in an affective function. Furthermore, additive counterfactuals have shown greater potential to induce behavioral intentions of improving performance. Hence, counterfactual thinking motivates individuals to making goal-oriented actions in order to attain their (failed) goal in the future.

Collective action

On the other hand, at a group level, counterfactual thinking can lead to collective action. According to Milesi and Catellani (2011), political activists exhibit group commitment and are more likely to re-engage in collective action following a collective defeat and show when they are engaging in counterfactual thinking. Unlike the cognitive processes involved at individual level, abstract counterfactuals lead to an increase in group identification, which is positively correlated with collective action intention. The increase in group identification impacts on people's affect. Abstract counterfactuals also lead to an increase in group efficacy. Increase in group efficacy translates to belief that the group has the ability to change outcomes in situations. This in turn motivates group members to make group-based actions to attain their goal in the future.

Benefits and consequences

When thinking of downward counterfactual thinking, or ways that the situation could have turned out worse, people tend to feel a sense of relief. For example, if after getting into a car accident somebody thinks "At least I wasn't speeding, then my car would have been totaled." This allows for consideration of the positives of the situation, rather than the negatives. In the case of upward counterfactual thinking, people tend to feel more negative affect (e.g., regret, disappointment) about the situation. When thinking in this manner, people focus on ways that the situation could have turned out more positively:  for example, "If only I had studied more, then I wouldn't have failed my test".

Current research

As with many cognitive processes in the brain, current and upcoming research seeks to gain better insight into the functions and outcomes of how we think. Research for counterfactual thinking has recently been investigating various effects and how they might alter or contribute to counterfactual thinking.  One study by Rim and Summerville (2014) investigated the distance of the event in terms of time and how this length of time can affect the process by which counterfactual thinking can occur.  Their results showed that "people generated more downward counterfactuals about recent versus distant past events, while they tended to generate more upward counterfactuals about distant versus recent past events", which was consistent in their replications for social distance as well.  They also examine the possible mechanism of manipulating social distance and the effect this could have on responding to negative events in either a self-improvement or self-enhancement motivations.

Recent research by Scholl and Sassenberg (2014) looked to determine how perceived power in the situation can affect the counterfactual thought and process associated to understanding future directions and outlooks.  The research examined how manipulating the perceived power of the individual in the given circumstance can lead to different thoughts and reflections, noting that "demonstrated that being powerless (vs. powerful) diminished self-focused counterfactual thinking by lowering sensed personal control". These results may show a relationship between how the self perceives events and determines the best course of action for future behavior.

Types

Upward and downward

Upward counterfactual thinking focuses on how the situation could have been better. Many times, people think about what they could have done differently. For example, "If I started studying three days ago, instead of last night, I could have done better on my test." Since people often think about what they could have done differently, it is not uncommon for people to feel regret during upward counterfactual thinking.

Downward counterfactual thinking focuses on how the situation could have been worse. In this scenario, a person can make themselves feel better about the outcome because they realize that the situation is not the worst it could be. For example, "I'm lucky I earned a 'C' on that; I didn't start studying until last night."

Additive/subtractive

A counterfactual statement may involve the action or inaction of an event that originally took place. An additive statement involves engaging in an event that did not originally occur (e.g., I should have taken medicine) whereas a subtractive statement involves removing an event that took place (e.g., I should have never started drinking). Additive counterfactuals are more frequent than subtractive counterfactuals.

Additive and upward counterfactual thinking focuses on "what else could I have done to do well?". Subtractive and upward counterfactual thinking focuses on "what shouldn't I have done so I could do well?". In contrast, an additive and downward scenario would be, "If I went drinking last night as well, I would have done even worse", while a subtractive and downward scenario would be, "if I didn't start studying two days ago, I would have done much worse".

Self vs. other

This distinction simply refers to whether the counterfactual is about actions of the self (e.g., I should have slowed down) or someone else's actions (e.g., The other driver should have slowed down). Self counterfactuals are more prevalent than other person focused counterfactuals.

Construal level theory explains that self counterfactuals are more prevalent because the event in question is psychologically closer than an event in which others are involved.

Theories

Norm theory

Kahneman and Miller (1986) proposed the norm theory as a theoretical basis to describe the rationale for counterfactual thoughts. Norm theory suggests that the ease of imagining a different outcome determines the counterfactual alternatives created. Norms involve a pairwise comparison between a cognitive standard and an experiential outcome. A discrepancy elicits an affective response which is influenced by the magnitude and direction of the difference. For example, if a server makes twenty dollars more than a standard night, a positive affect will be evoked. If a student earns a lower grade than is typical, a negative affect will be evoked. Generally, upward counterfactuals are likely to result in a negative mood, while downward counterfactuals elicit positive moods.

Kahneman and Miller (1986) also introduced the concept of mutability to describe the ease or difficulty of cognitively altering a given outcome. An immutable outcome (i.e., gravity) is difficult to modify cognitively whereas a mutable outcome (i.e., speed) is easier to cognitively modify. Most events lie somewhere in the middle of these extremes. The more mutable the antecedents of an outcome are, the greater availability there is of counterfactual thoughts.

Wells and Gavanski (1989) studied counterfactual thinking in terms of mutability and causality. An event or antecedent is considered causal if mutating that event will lead to undoing the outcome. Some events are more mutable than others. Exceptional events (i.e., taking an unusual route then getting into an accident) are more mutable than normal events (i.e., taking a usual route and getting into an accident). This mutability, however, may only pertain to exceptional cases (i.e., car accident). Controllable events (i.e., intentional decision) are typically more mutable than uncontrollable events (i.e., natural disaster). In short, the greater the number of alternative outcomes constructed, the more unexpected the event, and the stronger emotional reaction elicited.

Rational imagination theory
Byrne (2005) outlined a set of cognitive principles that guide the possibilities that people think about when they imagine an alternative to reality. Experiments show that people tend to think about realistic possibilities, rather than unrealistic possibilities, and they tend to think about few possibilities rather than many. Counterfactuals are special in part because they require people to think about at least two possibilities (reality, and an alternative to reality), and to think about a possibility that is false, temporarily assumed to be true. Experiments have corroborated the proposal that the principles that guide the possibilities that people think about most readily, explain their tendencies to focus on, for example, exceptional events rather than normal events, actions rather than inactions, and more recent events rather than earlier events in a sequence.

Functional theory

The functional theory looks at how counterfactual thinking and its cognitive processes benefit people. Counterfactuals serve a preparative function, and help people avoid past blunders. Counterfactual thinking also serves the affective function to make a person feel better. By comparing one's present outcome to a less desirable outcome, the person may feel better about the current situation (1995). For example, a disappointed runner who did not win a race may feel better by saying, "At least I did not come in last."

Although counterfactual thinking is largely adaptive in its functionality, there are exceptions. For individuals experiencing severe depressive symptoms, perceptions of control are diminished by negative self-perceptions and low self-efficacy. As a result, motivation for self-improvement is weakened. Even when depressed individuals focus on controllable events, their counterfactuals are less reasonable and feasible. Epstude and Roese (2008) propose that excessive counterfactual thoughts can lead people to worry more about their problems and increase distress. When individuals are heavily focused on improving outcomes, they will be more likely to engage in maladaptive counterfactual thinking. Other behavior such as procrastination may lead to less effective counterfactual thinking. Procrastinators show a tendency to produce more downward counterfactuals than upward counterfactuals. As a result, they tend to become complacent and lack motivation for change. Perfectionists are another group for whom counterfactual thinking may not be functional.

Rational counterfactuals

Tshilidzi Marwala introduced rational counterfactual which is a counterfactual that, given the factual, maximizes the attainment of the desired consequent. For an example, suppose we have a factual statement: She forgot to set her alarm, and consequently, was late. Its counterfactual would be: if she had set the alarm, she would have been on time. The theory of rational counterfactuals identifies the antecedent that gives the desired consequent necessary for rational decision making. For example, suppose there is an explosion in some chemical plant. The rational counterfactual will be what should have been the situation to ensure that the possibility of an explosion is minimized.

Examples

In the case of Olympic Medalists, counterfactual thinking explains why bronze medalists are often more satisfied with the outcome than silver medalists. The counterfactual thoughts for silver medalists tend to focus on how close they are to the gold medal, upward counterfactually thinking about the event, whereas bronze medalists tend to counterfactual think about how they could have not received a medal at all, displaying downward counterfactual thinking.

Another example is the satisfaction of college students with their grades.  Medvec and Savitsky studied satisfaction of college students based on whether their grade just missed the cut off versus if they had just made the cutoff for a category. Students that just made it into a grade category tended to downward counterfactual think and were more satisfied, thinking it could be worse. These students tended to think in terms of "At least I." However, students that were extremely close to making it into the next highest category showed higher dissatisfaction and tended to upward counterfactual think, or focus on how the situation could have been better. These students tended to think in terms of "I could have."

See also
 Counterfactual history
 Parallel universe (disambiguation)

References

Further reading
 Moffit, Michael L. and Robert C. Bordone (2005). The Handbook of Dispute Resolution. San Francisco: Jossey-Bass. 

Cognitive psychology